Košarkaški klub Radnički KG 06, commonly referred to as Radnički KG 06, was a men's professional basketball club based in Kragujevac, Serbia.

History 

The club was founded in 2004 by the merger of two local clubs (Radnički and Zastava), and was named KK Radnički Zastava. 

In 2006, the club switched its name to just KK Radnički, and competed under the sponsorship name Radnički 034 Group. From 2009, the club was known as KK Radnički KG 06. In the summer of 2006, the club bought the Basketball League of Serbia license from Atlas.

Radnički KG 06 played in the Balkan International Basketball League during the 2008–09 season.

Players

Coaches

  Slobodan Nikolić (2004–2005)
  Aleksandar Bućan (2005–2006)
  Zoran Cvetanović (2006–2008)
  Radovan Pešić (2008–2009)

Season by season

References

External links
 KK Radnički KG 06 at balkanleague.net
 KK Radnički KG 06 at srbijasport.net
 KK Radnički KG 06 at srbijasport.net
 Profile at eurobasket.com
 

KK Radnicki KG 06
Radnicki KG 06
Radnicki KG 06
Basketball teams established in 2004
2004 establishments in Serbia
2011 disestablishments in Serbia
Sport in Kragujevac